Bilma is a department of the Agadez Region in Niger. Its capital lies at the city of Bilma. As of 2012, the department had a total population of 17,935 people.

Communes
Bilma
Dirkou
Djado
Fachi

References

Departments of Niger
Agadez Region